Tisheh Gari (also Romanized as Tīsheh Garī; also known as Tīsh Garī) is a village in Doshman Ziari Rural District, Doshman Ziari District, Mamasani County, Fars Province, Iran. At the 2006 census, its population was 91, in 26 families.

References 

Populated places in Mamasani County